Barton and Walton railway station  opened in 1839 by the Birmingham and Derby Junction Railway on its original route from Derby to Hampton-in-Arden meeting the London and Birmingham Railway for London.

The village of Walton-upon-Trent itself is in Derbyshire, but the station was in Staffordshire.

History
Pixton suggests that it was initially called Walton, but Butt does not have any record. Originally it may have simply been a halt, but under the Midland Railway it acquired substantial brick buildings. The Midland would have had to rename it when it opened Walton in 1846 on the Syston and Peterborough line. The station closed in 1958, although an unadvertised train stopped on 11 September 1961.

Route

References

External links
 The Birmingham and Derby Junction Railway

Former Midland Railway stations
Railway stations in Great Britain opened in 1839
Railway stations in Great Britain closed in 1958
Disused railway stations in Staffordshire